The Men's 1000 metres competition at the 2020 World Single Distances Speed Skating Championships was held on February 15, 2020.

Results
The race was started at 13:36.

References

Men's 1000 metres